Raymond Arthur Dart (4 February 1893 – 22 November 1988) was an Australian anatomist and anthropologist, best known for his involvement in the 1924 discovery of the first fossil ever found of Australopithecus africanus, an extinct hominin closely related to humans, at Taung in the North of South Africa in the Northwest province.

Early life
Raymond Dart was born in Toowong, a suburb of Brisbane, Queensland, Australia, the fifth of nine children and son of a farmer and tradesman. His birth occurred during the 1893 flood which filled his parents' home and shop in Toowong. The family moved alternately between their country property near Laidley and their shop in Toowong. The young Dart attended Toowong State School, Blenheim State School and earned a scholarship to Ipswich Grammar School from 1906 to 1909. Dart considered becoming a medical missionary to China and wished to study medicine at the University of Sydney, but his father argued that he should accept the scholarship he won to the newly established University of Queensland and study science. He was a member of the first intake of students to the university in 1911 and studied geology under H.C. Richards and zoology, taking his BSc in 1913. Dart became the first student to graduate with honours from the University of Queensland in 1914 and took his MSc with honours from UQ in 1916. He studied medicine at the University of Sydney taking his MB and M.Surgery in 1917, and conducting his residency at St Andrews College, University of Sydney. He would be awarded his M.D. from the University of Sydney in 1927.

Dart served as a captain and medic in the Australian Army in England and France during the last year of World War I.

Following the war, he took up a position as a senior demonstrator at the University College, London in 1920 at the behest of Grafton Elliot Smith, famed anatomist, anthropologist and fellow Australian. This would be followed by a year on a Rockefeller Foundation Fellowship at Washington University in St. Louis. Returning to England and work at the University College, London, he then reluctantly took up the position of Professor at the newly established department of anatomy at the University of the Witwatersrand in Johannesburg, South Africa in 1922, after encouragement from Elliot Smith and Sir Arthur Keith.

Career

In 1924, Dart discovered the first Australopithecus africanus fossil, an extinct hominin closely related to humans. His colleague, Professor Robert Burns Young from the Buxton Limeworks, had sent Dart two crates of fossils from the small town of Taung in the North West Province of South Africa. Upon seeing the fossils, Dart immediately recognized one as being an early human because its brain dimensions were too large for a baboon or chimpanzee. Blasting had exposed a breccia-filled cave and the child's skull had come to light together with several fossilized monkeys and hyraxes. M. de Bruyn had noticed their unusual nature in November 1924 and informed the Limeworks manager, Mr. A.E. Spiers.

As Dart was not part of the scientific establishment, and because Raymond found the fossil in Africa, and not Europe or Asia, where the establishment supposed man's origins, his findings were initially dismissed.

Dart's closest ally was Robert Broom whose discoveries of further Australopithecines (as well as Wilfrid Le Gros Clark's support) eventually vindicated Dart, so much so that in 1947 Sir Arthur Keith said "...Dart was right, and I was wrong". Keith made this statement referring to his dismissal and skepticism of Dart's analysis of the 'Taung Child' as an early human ancestor; Keith thought that it was more likely to be an ape, yet later research by Broom confirmed Dart's theories. Dart's theories were also popularized by playwright, screenwriter, and science writer Robert Ardrey, first in an article published in The Reporter and reprinted in Science Digest, and later in Ardrey's influential four-book Nature of Man Series, which began in 1961 with African Genesis.

Not all of Dart's theories would in the end be vindicated. A number of his theories including that of the Killer Ape, have been called into question. His work was clearly influenced by the mentors he worked with in his early career, in particular Grafton Elliot Smith.

Neuroscience
Dart proposed the idea of dual evolutionary origins of the neocortex. During his research in the 1930s in Africa, he studied the architecture of reptilian brains. He was able to identify a "primordial neocortex" (paraphrased), the oldest structure that can be considered as a neocortex, in a reptile. He identified a distinction between the cytoarchitecture in an area which split it into a Para-Hippocampal and a Para-Pyriform region.

Personal life
Dart married Dora Tyree, a medical student from Virginia, U.S.A., in 1921 in Woods Hole, Massachusetts, U.S.A., and they divorced in 1934. He married Marjorie Frew, head librarian at the University of Witwatersrand in Johannesburg, South Africa in 1936 and they had two children, Diana and Galen.

Legacy 
The Institute for the Study of Man in Africa was established in 1956 at Witwatersrand in his honor by Phillip Tobias.In 1964  was inaugurated at the Institute the first Raymond Dart Memorial Lecture 

Dart was director of the School of Anatomy at the University of the Witwatersrand, Johannesburg until 1958. There he worked with Phillip Tobias (1925-2012), who continued his work in the study of the Cradle of Humankind and other paleoanthropological sites. In 1959, an autobiographical account of Dart's discoveries, Adventures with the Missing Link, was published (with Dennis Craig as co-author). In the book he acknowledges the crucial role played by his first female student and Demonstrator, Josephine Salmons. She brought to his attention the existence of a fossilised baboon skull at the house of Mr E.G. Izod, director of the Northern Lime Company and proprietor of a quarry in Taung. The skull was kept as an ornament on the mantlepiece above the fireplace at his home. In bringing the skull to show Prof. Raymond Dart, she set in motion a chain of events that led to the discovery of the 'Child skull of Taung' She later became wife of Prof. Cecil Jackson, Professor of Anatomy at Onderstepoort Veterinary Institute, University of Pretoria.

At the age of 73, Dart began dividing his time between South Africa and The Institutes for the Achievement of Human Potential (IAHP), an organization founded by Glenn Doman. Dart spent much of the next twenty years working with the IAHP, an organization that treats brain injured children. His son, Galen Dart had suffered motor damage during birth in 1941. Raymond Dart died in Johannesburg in 1988, and was survived by his wife and children.

Works
 Dart R.A. (1925): Australopithecus africanus: The Man-Ape of South Africa. Nature, Vol.115, No.2884 (1925) 195-9 (the original paper communicating the Taung finding, in PDF format).
 Dart, R.A. (1953): "The Predatory Transition from Ape to Man." International Anthropological and Linguistic Review, 1, pp. 201–217.The publication does not exist on line, but in "http://www.users.miamioh.edu/erlichrd/vms_site/dart.html" there is a copy of the article.
 Dart, Raymond A. and Craig, Dennis (1959): Adventures with the Missing Link. New York: Harper & Brothers (autobiography).
 Fagan, Brian. The Passion of Raymond Dart. Archaeology v. 42 (May–June 1989): p. 18.
 Johanson, Donald & Maitland Edey. Lucy: The Beginnings of Humankind. New York: Simon & Schuster, 1990 
 Murray, Alexander ed. (1996): Skill and Poise: Articles on skill, poise and the F. M. Alexander Technique.   Collection of Raymond Dart's papers. Hardcover, 192+xiv pages, b/w illustrations, 234 x 156 mm, index, UK, STAT Books.

See also

 Dawn of Humanity (2015 PBS film)
 Hominidae
 Human evolution
 List of fossil sites (with link directory)
 List of hominina fossils (with images)
 Prehistoric warfare
 W. Maxwell Cowan, his student

References

External links
Essay by C. K. Brain, "Raymond Dart and our African origins," accompanying the reprint of Raymond Dart's 1925 Nature article in A Century of Nature: Twenty-One Discoveries that Changed Science and the World, Laura Garwin and Tim Lincoln, eds.
Biography of Raymond Dart on Minnesota State University, Mankato EMuseum website
Biography of Raymond Dart in the TalkOrigins Archive.

1893 births
1988 deaths
Australian anatomists
Australian anthropologists
South African anthropologists
Australian archaeologists
South African archaeologists
Australian expatriates in South Africa
Human evolution theorists
Paleoanthropologists
People from Brisbane
Physical anthropologists
University of Sydney alumni
Alumni of University College London
20th-century archaeologists
20th-century anthropologists
Presidents of the South African Archaeological Society
Presidents of the Southern Africa Association for the Advancement of Science
University of Queensland alumni
Academic staff of the University of the Witwatersrand
Washington University in St. Louis fellows